Suleiman Pasha (also transliterated as "Sulayman Pasha", "Süleyman Pasha", "Suleyman Pasha", "Sulejman Pasha") may refer to one of the following persons:

 Süleyman Pasha (son of Orhan) ( 1316–1357), Ottoman son of Orhan
 Hadım Suleiman Pasha (governor of Rumelia) ( 1474–1490), Ottoman governor of Rumelia and Anatolia
 Hadım Suleiman Pasha (died 1547), Ottoman grand vizier and governor of Egypt
 Süleyman Pasha (Venetian), ( 1599–1603), Ottoman governor of Algeria (1599–1603)
 Sulejman Bargjini ( 1614), Ottoman general, founder of Tirana

 Suleiman, sanjak-bey of Scutari (fl. 1685)
 İzmirli Süleyman Pasha (died 1721), Ottoman kapudan pasha
 Sarı Süleyman Pasha (died 1687), Ottoman grand vizier
 Ermeni Suleyman Pasha (died 1687), Ottoman grand vizier
 Sulayman Pasha the Great (died 1761), Mamluk ruler of Iraq
 Sulejman-paša Skopljak ( 1804–17), Ottoman military commander and governor of Belgrade
 Sulayman Pasha al-Adil ( 1750-1819), vali of Sidon and governor of Acre  
 Soliman Pasha al-Faransawi (1788–1860), also known as Colonel Sève, French-born Egyptian commander
 Suleiman Pasha (Ottoman general) ( 1840–1892), Ottoman commander
 Süleyman Şefik Pasha ( 1919–1920), Ottoman military officer
 Süleyman Sabri Pasha (1873–1941), officer of the Ottoman Army and the general of the Turkish Army

See also
 Süleymanpaşa, the designated central district of Tekirdağ Province of Turkey after 2014
 Rulers of Damascus, some of whom were named "Sulayman Pasha" and "Süleyman Pasha"
 Suleiman